Mary Ann Yates Corkling, also known as May Yates, (18 May 1850 – 30 May 1938) was an English painter and food reformer. She spread news of the claimed health benefits for wholemeal bread and became a vegetarian out of her regard for other animals.

Biography

Early life
Corkling was born in Withington, a suburb of Manchester, to Mary Anne Corkling (née Booth) and Robert Yates Corkling, who was a cashier and aspiring merchant.

One source relates that her parents were concerned at how strongly myopic their daughter was, and she was excused from drawing in school in case it strained her eyes. However, she chanced to copy a painting and do some drawing from life, which revealed a talent for painting. She enrolled in Dudley School of Art. A later source says the family moved house to where her talent was encouraged. She was sent to Sicily to practise her skills.

Paintings
Corkling mainly painted flowers and figures. In 1878, she had a painting shown at the Royal Academy. In 1875 she exhibited with the Society of Lady Artists and several other galleries.

Food reform
Soon membership of the Ladies' Sanitary Association showed her burgeoning interest in social reform.

During her time in Sicily, Corkling noticed how healthy the peasants were and associated this with the brown bread they ate. She sold her own jewellery to fund experiments to wean Manchester from the popular white wheaten bread. This led to the formation of a Bread Reform League in 1880 at Kensington Town Hall, with Corkling leading it. At her parents' request she used the name May Yates for this, as it was thought unseemly for a woman of the Corkling family to be a public figure. Huxley and others offered their support.

Corkling wrote on the advantages of brown bread and other women volunteered their time to give lectures on the subject. Money at the League was tight and Corkling tried to use her own income to fund pamphlets. Her interest in food reform led her to become a vegetarian and she was secretary of the London Vegetarian Society (1890–1893).

The Bread Reform League later merged with the London Vegetarian Society. Corkling promoted whole grains, vegetarianism and condemned alcohol and white bread. She influenced Mahatma Gandhi to support the whole grain movement. In 1892 The Staff of Life by "May Yates" was published in the Society's journal, The Vegetarian. Around that time, she also travelled to Belgium to speak to large audiences in French. In 1895, she led the World's Women's Christian Temperance Union in forming a food reform department and herself became a full vegetarian. She spoke of humanity's obligation to other animals and in 1901 led the Women's Vegetarian Union briefly.

Wholemeal bread underwent a revival, with support of the Daily Mail and Lyons teashops. In 1916 she wrote in The Graphic about the advantages of not eating white bread. However, the message became harder to put forward during the First World War, when "war bread" was introduced, although it was created according to recipes that Corkling had supplied.

Death
Mary Corkling died on 30 May 1938.

References

1850 births
1938 deaths
19th-century English painters
19th-century British women artists
Artists from Manchester
British vegetarianism activists
British women activists
People associated with the Vegetarian Society
People from Withington